KETF-CD (channel 39) is a low-power, Class A television station in Laredo, Texas, United States, affiliated with the Spanish-language UniMás network. It is owned by Entravision Communications alongside Univision affiliate KLDO-TV (channel 27) and Class A Fox affiliate KXOF-CD (channel 31). The three stations share studios on Bob Bullock Loop in Laredo; KETF-CD's transmitter is located on Shea Street north of downtown.

History
From 1999 to 2007 (under the ownership of the executors of Carlos Ortiz's estate, who were also the co-founders of La Familia Network and Fe-TV), it broadcast programming from TBN Enlace USA 24 hours a day, as KNEZ-LP. In March 2007, the station was acquired by Entravision Communications Corporation, owners of KLDO-TV and KETF-CD, with the intent to affiliate the station with the Fox network. In July 2007, Entravision changed the station's callsign to KXOF-CA and began to air Fox programming. With this change, San Antonio Fox affiliate KABB (which was carried on Time Warner Cable's Laredo system) was removed from the provider's lineup due to FCC rules.

On August 1, 2012, KXOF-CA turned off its analog signal and started broadcasting Fox in high definition on virtual channel 39.1 and MundoFox in standard definition on 39.2. MundoFox, which rebranded to MundoMax in 2015, folded on November 30, 2016. In February 2017, KXOF-CD began to carry Azteca América on 39.2. Prior to this affiliation, Azteca América was carried solely through the network's national feed on Time Warner Cable.

KETF-CD and sister station KXOF-CD swapped call letters on December 13, 2018, resulting in the Fox/MyNetworkTV affiliate retaining the KXOF-CD call letters and KETF-CD now being a dual UniMás/Azteca-affiliated station.

Technical information

Subchannels
The station's digital signal is multiplexed:

References

External links

UniMás network affiliates
Rewind TV affiliates
ETF-CD
Television channels and stations established in 1995
Low-power television stations in the United States
Entravision Communications stations
Spanish-language television stations in Texas